Culverwell may refer to:

Places
Caliente, Nevada, formerly known as Culverwell
Culverwell Mesolithic Site, on the Isle of Portland, Dorset, England

People
Nathaniel Culverwell (1619–1651), an English author and theologian
Cyril Thomas Culverwell (1895–1963), a British Conservative Party politician
Andrew Culverwell (born 1944), an English Contemporary Christian music artist and songwriter
Charles Wyndham (actor) (1837–1919), born as Charles Culverwell